Cynthia J Neville, FRHistS, FSAScot is a Canadian historian, medievalist and George Munro professor of history at Dalhousie University in Halifax, Nova Scotia.  Neville's primary research interests are the social, political and cultural history of medieval Scotland, 1000–1500, specifically legal history, Gaelic-Norman interactions and Gaelic lordship.  She is also interested in English legal history from 1250 to 1500.  Neville is currently working on a project concerning royal pardon in Scotland from 1100 to 1603.

Publications
Neville, Cynthia J. 'Land, Law and People in Medieval Scotland'.  Edinburgh: Edinburgh University Press, 2010.
Neville, Cynthia J. Native lordship in medieval Scotland : the earldoms of Strathearn and Lennox, c.1140-1365. Dublin : Four Courts Press, 2005. xv, 255 p. : maps ; 24 cm. 
Neville, Cynthia J. Violence, custom and law : the Anglo-Scottish border lands in the later Middle Ages. / Cynthia J. Neville. Edinburgh : Edinburgh University Press, c1998. xiv, 226 p. ; 24 cm.

Awards
2006 Margaret Wade Labarge Prize for the book, Native Lordship in Medieval Scotland from the  Canadian Society of Medievalists.
2003-2004 winner of the Burgess Research Award.

References
Faculty Profile, Dalhousie University Department of History.
Awards

Canadian medievalists
Women medievalists
Living people
Year of birth missing (living people)
Canadian women historians
20th-century Canadian historians
21st-century Canadian historians
20th-century Canadian women writers
Fellows of the Royal Historical Society
21st-century Canadian women writers
British women historians